Double tracking or doubling is an audio recording technique in which a performer sings or plays along with their own prerecorded performance, usually to produce a stronger or bigger sound than can be obtained with a single voice or instrument. It is a form of overdubbing; the distinction comes from the doubling of a part, as opposed to recording a different part to go with the first. The effect can be further enhanced by panning one of the performances hard left and the other hard right in the stereo field.

Automation
Artificial or automatic double tracking, also known as ADT, was developed at Abbey Road Studios by engineers recording The Beatles in the 1960s. It used variable speed tape recorders connected in such a way as to mimic the effect created by double tracking. ADT produced a unique sound that could be imitated but not precisely duplicated by later analog and digital delay devices, which are capable of producing an effect called doubling echo. The effect is used to give one singer a fuller sound.

Examples
Double tracking was pioneered by Buddy Holly. John Lennon particularly enjoyed using the technique for his vocals while in the Beatles. Lennon's post-Beatles albums frequently employed doubling echo on his vocals in place of the ADT. Some critics complained that the effect gave the impression that Lennon recorded all his vocals in a bathroom, but some performers, like Black Francis and Paul Simon, value the rich echo chamber sound that it produces. Paul McCartney also commonly used this technique for his vocals while in the Beatles.

See also
Multitrack recording
Bleed-through

References

External links
 Sauravb (September 2021). "Comprehensive guide to double tracking". Vstnation.
 

Sound recording
Audio engineering